Starogusevo is a rural locality (a selo) in Starokuruchevsky Selsoviet, Bakalinsky District, Bashkortostan, Russia. The population was 306 as of 2010. There are 2 streets.

Geography 
Starogusevo is located 30 km southeast of Bakaly (the district's administrative centre) by road. Novogusevo is the nearest rural locality.

References 

Rural localities in Bakalinsky District